Prandelli is an Italian surname. Notable people with the surname include:

Cesare Prandelli (born 1957), Italian footballer and manager
Giacinto Prandelli (1914–2010), Italian opera singer
Matteo Prandelli (born 1988), Italian footballer

Italian-language surnames